Woodward Camp or Camp Woodward is a sleep away summer camp in Woodward, Pennsylvania, United States. It was founded in 1970 by Edward Isabelle, who was an All-American gymnast.

Named after a small town 35 minutes east of State College, Pennsylvania, Woodward started out as a gymnastics camp. When the US decided to boycott the 1980 Olympic games, Woodward Camp expanded its programming to include BMX racing. The BMX program quickly grew and the facilities were expanded to include ramps.

In December 2008, Copper Mountain resort in Colorado opened the first installment  of 'Woodward at Copper' with the Cage, a retail store focused on action sports with such features as an indoor skate bowl and the Woodward All Ages Lounge. Woodward at Copper offers winter camp days and week-long residential summer camps, including dry land as well as mountain facilities and training areas.

Woodward opened its first international camp, Woodward Beijing, in Beijing, China in the summer of 2010.

FUEL TV Presents Camp Woodward is a show about Woodward campers and their experiences. FUEL TV and Woodward partnered to create the show in 2007, and its fourth season began airing in February 2011.

On June 9, 2011, Woodward opened Woodward Tahoe, at Boreal Mountain Resort, just outside Truckee, California.

References

External links
 

Summer camps in Pennsylvania